Prime Fm is a radio station in Banepa, Kavre, Nepal. It transmits on 104.5 MHz. It provides news, information and entertainment.

References

External links
 

Radio stations in Nepal